San Giorgio di Nogaro (Central Eastern Friulian: San Zorz) is a comune (municipality) in the Province of Udine in the Italian region Friuli-Venezia Giulia, located about  northwest of Trieste and about  south of Udine.

The municipality of San Giorgio di Nogaro contains the frazioni (subdivisions, mainly villages and hamlets) Chiarisacco, Galli, Porto Nogaro, Villanova, Zellina, and Zuccola.

San Giorgio di Nogaro borders the following municipalities: Carlino, Castions di Strada, Grado, Marano Lagunare, Porpetto, Torviscosa.

Demographic evolution

International relations

Twin towns – Sister cities
San Giorgio di Nogaro is twinned with:

 Völkermarkt, Austria
 Mezohegyes, Hungary

Transportation
 San Giorgio di Nogaro railway station

References

External links
 www.comune.sangiorgiodinogaro.ud.it/

Cities and towns in Friuli-Venezia Giulia